The 2016 South American Under-23 Championships in Athletics was the seventh edition of the biennial track and field competition for South American athletes aged under 23 years old, organised by CONSUDATLE. The tournament was held in Lima, Peru at the Villa Deportiva Nacional between 23 and 25 September.

Brazil was the dominant nation, winning 19 gold medals in its haul of 33. Colombia placed second with eight golds among its 22 medals. Ecuador and Peru were the next most successful nations. Brazilian sprinter Rodrigo do Nascimento was the most successful athlete of the tournament, taking four gold medals across the 100 metres, 200 metres, and relay races. Three other athletes won two individual gold medals, all of them women; Pía Fernández took a middle-distance double for Uruguay, while Claudine Gimenes won a horizontal jumps double and Izabela Rodrigues a shot/discus double for Brazil.

Medal summary

Men

Women

Medal table

Participation
Nations could enter up to two athletes per event, and one team per relay, with a squad limit of 85 athletes. Venezuela declined to participate as a result of the Venezuelan economic cris.

References

Medal table
Medal Table . Peruvian Athletics Federation. Retrieved on 2016-12-30.

External links

2016
South American Under-23 Championships in Athletics
South American Under-23 Championships in Athletics
South American Under-23 Championships in Athletics
Sports competitions in Lima
International athletics competitions hosted by Peru
South American Under-23 Championships in Athletics